Hydrophilus is the scientific name of two genera of organisms and may refer to:

Hydrophilus (insect), a genus of beetles in the family Hydrophilidae
Hydrophilus (plant), a genus of plants in the family Restionaceae